Ostashkovsky Uyezd (Осташковский уезд) was one of the subdivisions of the Tver Governorate of the Russian Empire. It was situated in the southwestern part of the governorate. Its administrative centre was Ostashkov.

Demographics
At the time of the Russian Empire Census of 1897, Ostashkovsky Uyezd had a population of 130,161. Of these, 98.8% spoke Russian, 0.5% Karelian, 0.4% Estonian and 0.1% Latvian as their native language.

References

 
Uezds of Tver Governorate
Tver Governorate